The Private Secretary is an 1883 play in three acts by Charles Hawtrey.

The Private Secretary may also refer to:

 The Private Secretary (1931 German film)
 The Private Secretary (1931 Italian film)
 The Private Secretary (1935 film)
 The Private Secretary (1953 film)